Penttinen is a Finnish surname. Notable people with the surname include:

 Aarne Penttinen (1918–1981), Finnish politician
 Petri Penttinen (born 1965), Finnish skier
 Rory Penttinen (born 1979), Finnish racing driver

Finnish-language surnames